The Nut is a 1921 American silent film comedy directed by Theodore Reed.

Fairbanks biographer Jeffrey Vance writes, "Admittedly a minor work, The Nut is frequently dismissed in critical assessments of Fairbanks's career. This is unfortunate, for it contains some fascinating sequences and reveals much about the actor-producer's state of mind at the time it was made." Vance also notes, "The picture is like a chaotic funhouse, filled with magical masquerades, illusions, and gimmicks of great momentary amusement."

Plot
Based upon a summary in a film publication, Charlie (Fairbanks) has a girlfriend Estrell (De La Motte) who has a theory that if rich people would take a number of poor children into their homes each day, the environment would cause the children to grow up properly. Since Estrell does not know any of these rich people, Charlie offers to arrange a meeting. However, Charlie thinks impostors will do as well as the real rich people, so first he hires some men who turn out to be burglars and gamblers. Then he tries using dummies, but Estell is not fooled and becomes indignant. A wealthy man working as a reporter goes to investigate a report of a man dragging a body which turns out to be Charlie moving a dummy, allowing Charlie to finally meet someone rich. Estell is satisfied and agrees to marry him.

Cast 
Douglas Fairbanks as Charlie Jackson
Marguerite De La Motte as Estrell Wynn
William Lowery as Philip Feeney
Gerald Pring as Gentleman George
Morris Hughes as Pernelius Vanderbrook Jr
Barbara La Marr as Claudine Dupree
Sidney De Gray (credited as Sydney dé Grey)

Frank Campeau, Jeanne Carpenter, Charles Chaplin, Mary Pickford and Charles Stevens appear uncredited.

Fairbanks biographer Jeffrey Vance disputes the claims of many film historians that Charlie Chaplin appears in the film. "It is clearly as Chaplin imitator, not Chaplin himself, who appears briefly in the party sequence wearing the Tramp costume."

References

External links 

The Nut at Virtual History

1921 films
American silent feature films
1920s English-language films
American black-and-white films
1921 romantic comedy films
Films directed by Theodore Reed
American romantic comedy films
Articles containing video clips
1920s American films
Silent romantic comedy films
Silent American comedy films